Kaija Vahtra (née Udras, born 4 December 1986) is an Estonian cross-country skier who has competed since 2005. At the 2010 Winter Olympics in Vancouver, she finished 16th in the team sprint, 31st in the individual sprint, and did not finish the 7.5 km + 7.5 km double pursuit events.

Vahtra competed at the FIS Nordic World Ski Championships 2009 in Liberec, finishing 11th in the team sprint, 15th in the 4 × 5 km relay, 21st in the individual sprint, and 54th in the 10 km event. Her best World Cup finish was 18th in a team sprint event at Germany in 2008 while her best individual finish was 19th in an individual sprint event at Slovenia in 2009.

Cross-country skiing results
All results are sourced from the International Ski Federation (FIS).

Olympic Games

World Championships

World Cup

Season standings

References

External links

1986 births
Cross-country skiers at the 2010 Winter Olympics
Estonian female cross-country skiers
Living people
Olympic cross-country skiers of Estonia
Sportspeople from Võru